Mark Miley is a dual player from County Roscommon, Ireland. He plays both Gaelic football and hurling with his club St Dominic's, of Knockroghery. At minor level, he played in goal for the Roscommon team that won the All-Ireland Minor Football Championship in 2006. After minor level, he went on to play at junior level for Roscommon footballers, where he won a Connacht Junior Football Championship in 2009.

In hurling he plays in the forwards and won All Ireland B medals at Under 21 level.

References

Year of birth missing (living people)
Living people
Dual players
Gaelic football goalkeepers
Roscommon inter-county Gaelic footballers
Roscommon inter-county hurlers
St Dominic's Gaelic footballers
St Dominic's hurlers